Macquartia grisea is a European species of fly in the family Tachinidae.

Ecology
Macquartia grisea is an endoparasitoid of the leaf beetle Chrysolina fastuosa.

References

Tachininae
Diptera of Europe
Insects described in 1810